Struthio orlovi is an extinct species of ratite bird from the Miocene of Moldavia.

Footnotes

References
 
 
 

Miocene birds
Extinct flightless birds
orlovi
Prehistoric birds of Europe
Fossil taxa described in 1970